Washington's 34th legislative district is one of forty-nine districts in Washington state for representation in the state legislature.

It covers all of Vashon as well as West Seattle, White Center, and west Burien.

The district's legislators are state senator Joe Nguyen and state representatives Emily Alvarado (position 1) and Joe Fitzgibbon (position 2), all Democrats.

See also
Washington Redistricting Commission
Washington State Legislature
Washington State Senate
Washington House of Representatives

References

External links
Washington State Redistricting Commission
Washington House of Representatives
Map of Legislative Districts

34